Dennis Phan (born September 8, 1985) is an American former competitive figure skater. He is the 2004 JGP Final champion and the 2003 U.S. national junior champion. He placed seventh at the 2004 World Junior Championships.

He is of Vietnamese descent.

Programs

Competitive highlights
GP: Grand Prix; JGP: Junior Grand Prix

References

External links
 

1985 births
Living people
American male single skaters
People from Dallas
American sportspeople of Vietnamese descent
People from Indio, California